Kean is both a surname and a given name. Notable people with the name include:

Surname

 Abram Kean (1855–1945), Newfoundland sealer and politician
 Andrew Kean (born 1978), Scottish football player
 Archie Kean (1894 – after 1925), Scottish footballer
 Arthur D. Kean (1882–1961), Canadian filmmaker
 Ben Kean, American physician, author and researcher
 Betty Kean (1914–1986), American actress, sister of Jane Kean
 Bridie Kean (born 1987), Australian wheelchair basketball player and canoeist.
 Charles Kean (1811–1868), actor, son of Edmund Kean
 Edmund Kean (1789–1833), English actor
 Edward Kean (1924–2010), American television writer
 Ellen Kean (1805–1880), English actress
 Gareth Kean (born 1991), New Zealand swimmer
 Gerald Kean (born 1957), Irish celebrity solicitor
 Giovanni Kean (born 1993), Italian football player
 Hamilton Fish Kean (1862–1941), United States Senator from New Jersey
 Henry Kean (1894–1955), American football and basketball coach
 Jake Kean (born 1991), English football player
 Jane Kean (1923–2013), American actress and singer, sister of Betty Kean
 Jefferson Randolph Kean (1860–1950), American military surgeon 
 John Kean (New Jersey politician) (1852–1914), United States Senator, United States Representative from New Jersey
 John Kean (South Carolina politician) (1756–1795), delegate to the Continental Congress from South Carolina
 Josh Kean (born 1993), Australian motor-racing driver
 Laurel Kean (born 1963), American golfer
 Mallory Kean, Canadian curler
 Mark Kean (born 1988), Canadian curler
 Marie Kean (1918–1993), Irish actress
 Michael Kean (died 1823), Irish artist, owner of Derby porcelain factory
 Moise Kean (born 2000), Italian football player
 Paul Kean, New Zealand musician
 Robert Kean (1893–1980), United States Representative from New Jersey
 Robert Garlick Hill Kean (1828–1898), Confederate States Army officer
 Roger Kean (died 2023), British magazine publisher
 Sam Kean, 21st-century American writer
 Sammy Kean, Scottish football player and manager
 Simon Kean (born 1989), Canadian professional boxer
 Sherry Kean, Canadian pop and country singer
 Steve Kean (born 1967), Scottish football player and manager
 Stewart Kean (born 1983), Scottish football player
 Thomas Kean (born 1935), American politician; former Governor of New Jersey; chairman of the 9/11 Commission
 Thomas Kean Jr. (born 1968), American politician; New Jersey State Senator; United States Senate nominee; United States Representative
 William Kean (1871–1954), British trade unionist
 William B. Kean (1897–1981), general in the United States Army

Given name
 Kean Bryan (born 1996), English football player
 Kean Cipriano (born 1987), Filipino singer, composer, actor, and musician
 Kean Soo, Canadian engineer, creator of the children's comic character Jellaby
 Kean Wong, American professional baseball player

Fictional characters:
 Kean Atreides, character in the universe of the Dune novels

See also
Sandra Keans (born 1942), American politician
Doug Keans (born 1958), Canadian hockey player